Pleuronectini is a tribe of fish in the Pleuronectinae subfamily.

Genera

 Kareius
 Limanda
 Liopsetta
 Parophrys
 Platichthys
 Pleuronectes
 Pseudopleuronectes

Pleuronectidae
Fish tribes